The 2014–15 3. Liga was the 22nd 3. liga season and the first one after reorganization in summer 2014. The league was composed by 66 teams divided in four different groups of 16 each and 3. liga Západ (West) included 18 teams. Teams were divided into four divisions: 3. liga Bratislava, 3. liga Západ (West), 3. liga Stred (Central), 3. liga Východ (Eastern), according to geographical separation.

3. liga Bratislava

Locations

League table

3. liga Západ

Locations

League table

3. liga Stred

Locations

League table

3. liga Východ

Locations

League table

References 

3
Slovak Third League
3. Liga (Slovakia) seasons